Henry Alexander Marsh (1836–1914) was an American banker and Republican politician who served as the mayor of Worcester, Massachusetts.

Early life
Marsh was born to Alexander and Maria (Fay) Marsh in Southborough, Massachusetts on September 7, 1836.  Marsh moved with his family to Worcester, Massachusetts 1859.

Education
From 1849 to 1852 Marsh went to the Worcester public schools, in 1852 Marsh entered high school, however he soon left High School and continued his studies under the private instruction of Edward Everett Hale.

Family life
Marsh married Emily W. Mason in 1864 they had three children.

Business career
In June 1853 Marsh began working at the Worcester Central Bank as a Clerk, he worked in various positions in that bank and on January 12, 1892, Marsh was elected President of the Central Bank.

Public service

Worcester Common Council
Marsh served on the Worcester, Massachusetts Common Council from 1867 to 1868.

Worcester Board of Aldermen
Marsh served on the Worcester, Massachusetts Board of Aldermen from 1878 to 1881, he was President of the Board of Aldermen in 1881.

Mayor of Worcester
In December, 1892 Marsh was first elected the Mayor of Worcester, Massachusetts, he served from January 2, 1893, to January 6, 1896.

Marsh was elected a member of the American Antiquarian Society in October, 1893.

Notes

1836 births
1914 deaths
Mayors of Worcester, Massachusetts
Massachusetts city council members
Massachusetts Republicans
American bankers
Businesspeople from Worcester, Massachusetts
Members of the American Antiquarian Society
19th-century American businesspeople